Stuart Crichton is a music producer/songwriter from Scotland, currently based in Los Angeles, California.

Career
Starting out in 1989 under the name Solo, Stuart self-released the Sample Free EP in 1990 which featured the song "Rainbow", using the theme tune from the children's show of the same name. It became a cult classic, with copies of the 12-inch vinyl selling for £150 plus at Eastern Blok record shop in Manchester, England. Follow-up records include "Come On" and "So Beautiful" in the early 1990s. In the mid-'90s, he formed the electronic/house music groups Umboza and Narcotic Thrust, the latter an anagram of Crichton's name. They released several singles, including "Safe from Harm", which reached number one on the Billboard Dance Club Songs chart in 2002, and "I Like It", which reached number 16 on the chart in 2004. At this time, Crichton was primarily producing dance tracks, releasing music on early progressive house labels such as FFRR, ZTT and Mushroom, and helping make Limbo Records a big part of the early '90s progressive house scene. In 1998, Crichton had a No. 17 UK Dance hit with the UK garage track "Happy Day", under the alias SJC.

Crichton has since written for and produced artists in a variety of genres, including Kylie Minogue, Backstreet Boys, Pet Shop Boys, Selena Gomez, Toni Braxton, Sugababes, DNCE and Kygo. He produced three songs on Stan Walker's 2010 album From the Inside Out, including the singles "Homesick" and "Choose You" (which he also co-wrote). He co-wrote and co-produced Kesha's single "Learn to Let Go", from her 2017 album Rainbow, as well as the track "Let 'em Talk" featuring Eagles of Death Metal. The album debuted at number 1 on the Billboard 200 albums chart, and was nominated for the 2018 Grammy Award for Best Pop Vocal Album. Three songs he wrote and produced were nominated at the 2019 Grammy Awards: "Don't Go Breaking My Heart" by the Backstreet Boys (Best Pop Duo/Group Performance); "Stargazing" by Kygo (Best Remixed Recording); and the album Sex & Cigarettes by Toni Braxton (Best R&B Album). He wrote and produced six songs on the 2019 Backstreet Boys album DNA, which debuted at number 1 on the Billboard 200 charts. Rolling Stone called Crichton the "common thread on DNA" and Vulture.com called the songs Crichton wrote for the album "the meat of DNA, a breezy collection of three-minute love songs that apply the singers’ airtight melodies to the sound of modern pop radio." Crichton wrote and produced Louis Tomlinson's 2019 single "Don't Let It Break Your Heart". He wrote and produced Kesha's 2019 single "Rich, White, Straight Men", and he wrote and produced four songs on her 2020 album High Road.

Personal life
Crichton is married to his wife Leeza. He lived in London for 18 years, relocated to Sydney, Australia in 2008, and then in 2015 to Los Angeles, California. He is published by Native Tongue for the World, and managed by Lucas Keller at Milk & Honey.

Awards

Discography

Singles

Writing and producing credits

References

External links
 

Living people
1968 births
Scottish songwriters
Scottish record producers
British expatriates in Australia
British expatriates in the United States
People from Ayr